Ralph David Engle (born November 30, 1956) is a former Major League Baseball utility player who played for the Minnesota Twins, Detroit Tigers and Milwaukee Brewers of the American League and the Montreal Expos of the National League from 1981 to 1989.

Pro career
A graduate of the University of Southern California, Engle was originally drafted in the 3rd round of the 1978 amateur draft by the California Angels. On February 3, 1979, he was traded by the Angels along with Brad Havens, Paul Hartzell and Ken Landreaux to the Minnesota Twins for Rod Carew. He played catcher, first base, third base, outfield and designated hitter.

In the minor leagues, Engle won the International League batting title in 1980, beating out  Wade Boggs .307 to .306. Four years later, he was selected to the American League All-Star team in 1984.

During his sophomore season, Engle became the first player to hit a home run in Minneapolis's newly opened Hubert H. Humphrey Metrodome. This occurred on opening day, April 6, 1982 and also marked the first hit, run scored, and RBI in the stadium's history.

Engle is the brother in-law of his former Twins teammate, Tom Brunansky.

References

External links
, or Retrosheet, or Pura Pelota

1956 births
Living people
American expatriate baseball players in Canada
American League All-Stars
Baltimore Orioles scouts
Baseball coaches from California
Baseball players from San Diego
Detroit Tigers players
Houston Astros coaches
Major League Baseball bullpen coaches
Major League Baseball catchers
Major League Baseball hitting coaches
Major League Baseball left fielders
Major League Baseball right fielders
Milwaukee Brewers players
Minnesota Twins players
Minor league baseball managers
Montreal Expos players
Nashville Sounds players
New York Mets coaches
New York Mets scouts
Oklahoma City 89ers players
Salinas Angels players
Tigres de Aragua players
American expatriate baseball players in Venezuela
Toledo Mud Hens players
Tucson Toros players
University of Southern California alumni
USC Trojans baseball players